The Wellhead Protection Program in the 1986 amendments to the Safe Drinking Water Act requires states to protect underground sources of drinking water from contaminants that may adversely affect human health. More than one-third of the people in the United States depend on groundwater for drinking water. However, residential, municipal, commercial, industrial, and agricultural activities can all contaminate groundwater. In the event of contamination, a community's drinking water supply can develop poor quality or be lost altogether. Groundwater contamination might not be detected for a long period of time and health problems can occur from drinking contaminated water. Cleanup of a contaminated underground source of drinking water may be impossible or so difficult it costs thousands or millions of dollars. The U.S. Congress requiring Wellhead Protection Programs by 42 U.S.C. § 300h–7 in the Safe Drinking Water Act applied the concept that it is better to prevent groundwater contamination than try to remediate it.  U.S. Congress by 42 U.S.C. § 300h–7 requires identification of the areas that need implementation of control measures in order to protect public water supply wells from contamination as "wellhead protection areas". Communities can use the police power established by the Tenth Amendment to the U.S. Constitution to enforce zoning and subdivision regulations to protect drinking water sources. Thereby communities can direct development away from areas that would pose a threat to drinking water sources.

Purpose
Public groundwater supply aquifers that can support a public water system are vital natural resources. According to an estimate by the U.S. Geological Survey 37% of public water comes from groundwater. The U.S. Geological Survey aquifer sampling for the National Water-Quality Assessment Program frequently found man-made contaminants at concentrations greater than human-health standards in public groundwater supply aquifers. The frequency of man-made contaminants in public water supply aquifers proves the vulnerability of these aquifers to inappropriate land uses. This vulnerability indicates the importance of wellhead protection. Wellhead protection is essential to have safe drinking water because the concentrations of many man-made carbon-containing contaminants are not decreased by commonly used drinking water treatment processes. Only by controlling the land uses of their public water source can a community control the quality of the water they drink. The U.S. Geological Survey aquifer sampling also frequently detected contaminants for which the U.S. Environmental Protection Agency has not yet established human health standards. Several Wikipedia articles involve the vulnerability of groundwater aquifers to contamination as follows:

Wellhead protection requirements created by Congress
U.S. Congress determined the nation's community water supplies must be protected.  The United States Code 42 U.S.C. § 300h–7 requires States protect their underground sources of drinking water (USDWs) by Wellhead Protection Programs. These Wellhead Protection Programs must specify the duties of State agencies, local governmental entities, and public water supply systems to develop and implement wellhead protections. Identification of the area that needs wellhead protection must be based on the hydrologic and geologic information on groundwater flow, recharge, and discharge. A community's Wellhead Protection Program must identify all man-made sources of contaminants in the wellhead protection area that may cause adverse health effects. There must be educational and control measures to protect the water supply from these identified sources of contaminants. There must also be a contingency plan for alternate drinking water supplies in the event of contamination. A community's Wellhead Protection Program must add in any new water well that serves a public water supply system.

Adverse effects on the health of persons
In 42 U.S.C. § 300h–7 U.S. Congress says each State shall "protect wellhead areas within their jurisdiction from contaminants which may have any adverse effect on the health of persons." The U.S. Environmental Protection Agency (EPA) says many microorganisms and chemicals have the potential to contaminate ground water. Bacteria and viruses can produce illnesses such as hepatitis, cholera, or giardiasis. High concentrations of nitrates can produce Methemoglobinemia or “blue baby syndrome”. Gasoline contamination promotes the formation of cancer. Lead contamination  causes learning disabilities in children as well as  nerve, kidney, liver, and pregnancy problems. The EPA goes on to say, "Hundreds of other chemicals, however, are not yet regulated, and many of their health effects are unknown or not well understood. Preventing contaminants from reaching the ground water is the best way to reduce the health risks associated with poor drinking water quality." Public health agencies report waterborne disease outbreaks to the Center of Disease Control. During the period from 1971 to 2006, a majority (52.7%) of the 801 reported deficiencies involved the use of contaminated groundwater,

Control measures

Communities evaluate the properties of the aquifer to determine the sensitive areas that need to be protected by local land use zoning. When land use zoning is based on competent scientific evidence to support wellhead protection, land use zoning has been upheld by courts. Communities direct the location of potential sources of contamination to areas outside of sensitive wellhead protection areas to ensure their underground source of drinking water (USDW) remains uncontaminated. For example, a community successfully blocked a proposed $12 million travel plaza/welcome center from endangering their water supply by local land use zoning that prohibits petroleum underground storage tanks (USTs) in a wellhead protection area.

Federal, State, and local agencies with regulatory and funding power can also limit development to areas outside sensitive wellhead protection areas. By project approvals and by funding authorizations these agencies can control the location of roads, water lines, and wastewater lines that are essential for intensive development.

To protect underground sources of drinking water (USDWs), the U.S. Congress requires Federal agencies by 42 U.S.C. § 300j–6 to comply with Wellhead Protection Programs and Underground Injection Control (UIC) Programs. Actions such as forestry management plans, pipelines, highways, etc. with federal control that may result in contamination of water supplies in wellhead protection areas must comply with Wellhead Protection Programs and Underground Injection Control Programs.

Primarily local government enforcement
The EPA says most local governments can protect underground sources of drinking water by establishing and enforcing zoning regulations. For example, a state court supported a community's denial of a variance from their land use ordinances prohibiting installation of underground petroleum storage tanks in a wellhead protection area. The court found the installation of underground petroleum storage tanks might cause substantial damage to the public good and would be contrary to the community's zoning code.

Several Federal statutes also relate to groundwater protection such as the Safe Drinking Water Act; the Resource Conservation and Recovery Act; the Comprehensive Environmental Response, Compensation, and Liability Act; Superfund Amendments and Reauthorization Act; the Clean Water Act; and the Federal Insecticide, Fungicide, and Rodenticide Act. For example, after a U.S. Geological Survey dye trace study identified the potential contamination risks in the Biscayne Aquifer were far greater than previously considered, a U.S. District Court applied the Clean Water Act (CWA) to deny permits for mining in order to protect public and private drinking water wells:

Contamination of an underground source of drinking water (USDW) may be a legal injury suffered by the public subject to court action. Even if the source of contamination had a permit for its operation that may not avoid groundwater contamination liability. The liability and high costs of groundwater cleanup can cause businesses to abandon problem sites leaving significant long-term financial losses to the community. Businesses want to locate in communities that protect their water supplies in order to avoid paying taxes to clean up someone else's multimillion-dollar contamination.

Protection of a public trust
In 1987 the New Jersey Superior Court says that the public trust doctrine applies to the protection of drinking water sources: 

In 2008 the Vermont legislature revised statute "Title 10, Chapter 048: Groundwater Protection" saying "the groundwater resources of the State are held in trust for the public" and "the groundwater resources of the State shall be managed to minimize the risks of groundwater quality deterioration by regulating human activities that present risks to the use of groundwater". In applying this statute the Vermont Superior Court said: 

U.S. Congress by the National Environmental Policy Act 42 U.S.C. § 4331(a) recognizes it is not acceptable to abuse renewable natural resources that would prevent their use by future generations. The role of the Federal government in water resources is shifting from resource development to environmental protection and water conservation.

Related

Underground Injection Control
The Underground Injection Control (UIC) Program prohibits underground injections that could endanger Underground Sources of Drinking Water (USDWs). For shallow injection wells, the U.S. Environmental Protection Agency has found  that storm waters directed into Class V injection wells contain many contaminants in concentrations above the drinking water standards or health advisory limits.

Environmental Protection Agency's emergency power
By 42 U.S.C. § 300i Congress gives the Environmental Protection Agency's Administrator emergency power to “take such actions as he may deem necessary in order to protect the health of” consumers of public water. This emergency power applies to preventing contamination of all Underground Sources of Drinking Water (USDWs). This includes USDWs future generations may need for public water and private wells.

Sole Source Aquifer
An aquifer can be designated as a Sole Source Aquifer if the aquifer supplies at least 50% of a community's drinking water and there is no alternative drinking water source. With this designation there can be no federal financial assistance for any project which the Environmental Protection Agency Administrator determines may contaminate the aquifer so as to create a significant hazard to public health.

Source Water Quality Assessment
States identify all the potential contaminate sources that might affect their surface and underground public water supplies for the Source Water Quality Assessment Program of 42 U.S.C.§ 300j–13.

See also

References

Drinking water regulation
Land management
Land use
United States federal environmental legislation
Water supply and sanitation in the United States